The term bureaucracy refers to a body of non-elected governing officials as well as to an  administrative policy-making group. Historically, a bureaucracy was a government administration managed by departments staffed with non-elected officials. Today, bureaucracy is the administrative system governing any large institution, whether publicly owned or privately owned. The public administration in many jurisdictions and sub-jurisdictions exemplifies bureaucracy, but so does any centralized hierarchical structure of an institution, e.g. hospitals, academic entities, business firms, professional societies, social clubs, etc.

There are two key dilemmas in bureaucracy. The first dilemma revolves around whether bureaucrats should be autonomous or directly accountable to their political masters. The second dilemma revolves around bureaucrats' behavior strictly following the law or whether they have leeway to determine appropriate solutions for varied circumstances.

Various commentators have argued for the necessity of bureaucracies in modern society. The German sociologist Max Weber (1864–1920) argued that bureaucracy constitutes the most efficient and rational way in which human activity can be organized and that systematic processes and organized hierarchies are necessary to maintain order, to maximize efficiency, and to eliminate favoritism. On the other hand, Weber also saw unfettered bureaucracy as a threat to individual freedom, with the potential of trapping individuals in an impersonal "iron cage" of rule-based, rational control.

Etymology and usage
The term "bureaucracy" originated in the French language: it combines the French word bureau – desk or office – with the Greek word κράτος (kratos) – rule or political power. The French economist Jacques Claude Marie Vincent de Gournay (1712–1759) coined the word in the mid-18th century. Gournay never wrote the term down but a letter from a contemporary later quoted him:

The first known English-language use dates to 1818 with Irish novelist Lady Morgan referring to the apparatus used by the British government to subjugate Ireland as "the Bureaucratie, or office tyranny, by which Ireland has so long been governed". By the mid-19th century the word appeared in a more neutral sense, referring to a system of public administration in which offices were held by unelected career officials. In this context "bureaucracy" was seen as a distinct form of management, often subservient to a monarchy. In the 1920s the German sociologist Max Weber expanded the definition to include any system of administration conducted by trained professionals according to fixed rules. Weber saw bureaucracy as a relatively positive development; however, by 1944 the Austrian economist Ludwig von Mises opined in the context of his experience in the Nazi regime that the term bureaucracy was "always applied with an opprobrious connotation", and by 1957 the American sociologist Robert Merton suggested that the term "bureaucrat" had become an "epithet, a Schimpfwort" in some circumstances. 

The word "bureaucracy" is also used in politics and government with a disapproving tone to disparage official rules that make it difficult to do things. In workplaces, the word is used very often to blame complicated rules, processes, and written work that make it hard to get something done. Socio-bureaucracy would then refer to certain social influences that may affect the function of a society.

In modern usage, modern bureaucracy has been defined as comprising four features:
 hierarchy (clearly defined spheres of competence and divisions of labor)
 continuity (a structure where administrators have a full-time salary and advance within the structure)
 impersonality (prescribed rules and operating rules rather than arbitrary actions)
 expertise (officials are chosen according to merit, have been trained, and hold access to knowledge)
Bureaucracy in a political theory is mainly a centralized form of management and tends to be differentiated from adhocracy, in which management tends more to decentralization.

History

Ancient

Although the term "bureaucracy" first originated in the mid-18th century, organized and consistent administrative systems existed much earlier. The development of writing ( 3500 BC) and the use of documents was critical to the administration of this system, and the first definitive emergence of bureaucracy occurred in ancient Sumer, where an emergent class of scribes used clay tablets to administer the harvest and to allocate its spoils. Ancient Egypt also had a hereditary class of scribes that administered the civil-service bureaucracy.

In China, when the Qin dynasty (221–206 BC) unified China under the Legalist system, the emperor assigned administration to dedicated officials rather than nobility, ending feudalism in China, replacing it with a centralized, bureaucratic government. The form of government created by the first emperor and his advisors was used by later dynasties to structure their own government. Under this system, the government thrived, as talented individuals could be more easily identified in the transformed society. The Han dynasty (202 BC – 220 AD) established a complicated bureaucracy based on the teachings of Confucius, who emphasized the importance of ritual in a family, in relationships, and in politics. With each subsequent dynasty, the bureaucracy evolved. In 165 BC, Emperor Wen introduced the first method of recruitment to civil service through examinations, while
Emperor Wu (r. 141–87 BC), cemented the ideology of Confucius into mainstream governance installed a system of recommendation and nomination in government service known as xiaolian, and a national academy whereby officials would select candidates to take part in an examination of the Confucian classics, from which Emperor Wu would select officials. 

In the Sui dynasty (581–618) and the subsequent Tang dynasty (618–907) the shi class would begin to present itself by means of the fully standardized civil service examination system, of partial recruitment of those who passed standard exams and earned an official degree. Yet recruitment by recommendations to office was still prominent in both dynasties. It was not until the Song dynasty (960–1279) that the recruitment of those who passed the exams and earned degrees was given greater emphasis and significantly expanded. During the Song dynasty (960–1279) the bureaucracy became meritocratic. Following the Song reforms, competitive examinations took place to determine which candidates qualified to hold given positions.
The imperial examination system lasted until 1905, six years before the Qing dynasty collapsed, marking the end of China's traditional bureaucratic system.

A hierarchy of regional proconsuls and their deputies administered the Roman Empire. The reforms of Diocletian (Emperor from 284 to 305) doubled the number of administrative districts and led to a large-scale expansion of Roman bureaucracy. The early Christian author Lactantius ( 250 –  325) claimed that Diocletian's reforms led to widespread economic stagnation, since "the provinces were divided into minute portions, and many presidents and a multitude of inferior officers lay heavy on each territory." After the Empire split, the Byzantine Empire developed a notoriously complicated administrative hierarchy, and in the 20th century the term "Byzantine" came to refer to any complex bureaucratic structure.

Modern

Ashanti Empire
The government of the Ashanti Empire is built upon a sophisticated bureaucracy in Kumasi, with separate ministries which saw to the handling of state affairs. Ashanti's Foreign Office was based in Kumasi. Despite the small size of the office, it allowed the state to pursue complex negotiations with foreign powers. The Office was divided into departments that handled Ashanti relations separately with the British, French, Dutch, and Arabs. Scholars of Ashanti history, such as Larry Yarak and Ivor Wilkes, disagree over the power of this sophisticated bureaucracy in comparison to the Asantehene. However, both scholars agree that it was a sign of a highly developed government with a complex system of checks and balances.

United Kingdom

Instead of the inefficient and often corrupt system of tax farming that prevailed in absolutist states such as France, the Exchequer was able to exert control over the entire system of tax revenue and government expenditure. By the late 18th century, the ratio of fiscal bureaucracy to population in Britain was approximately 1 in 1300, almost four times larger than the second most heavily bureaucratized nation, France. Thomas Taylor Meadows, Britain's consul in Guangzhou, argued in his Desultory Notes on the Government and People of China (1847) that "the long duration of the Chinese empire is solely and altogether owing to the good government which consists in the advancement of men of talent and merit only", and that the British must reform their civil service by making the institution meritocratic. Influenced by the ancient Chinese imperial examination, the Northcote–Trevelyan Report of 1854 recommended that recruitment should be on the basis of merit determined through competitive examination, candidates should have a solid general education to enable inter-departmental transfers, and promotion should be through achievement rather than "preferment, patronage, or purchase". This led to implementation of Her Majesty's Civil Service as a systematic, meritocratic civil service bureaucracy.

In the British civil service, just as it was in China, entrance to the civil service was usually based on a general education in ancient classics, which similarly gave bureaucrats greater prestige. The Cambridge-Oxford ideal of the civil service was identical to the Confucian ideal of a general education in world affairs through humanism. (Well into the 20th century, Classics, Literature, History and Language remained heavily favoured in British civil service examinations. In the period of 1925–1935, 67 percent of British civil service entrants consisted of such graduates.) Like the Chinese model's consideration of personal values, the British model also took personal physique and character into account.

France
Like the British, the development of French bureaucracy was influenced by the Chinese system. Under Louis XIV of France, the old nobility had neither power nor political influence, their only privilege being exemption from taxes. The dissatisfied noblemen complained about this "unnatural" state of affairs, and discovered similarities between absolute monarchy and bureaucratic despotism. With the translation of Confucian texts during the Enlightenment, the concept of a meritocracy reached intellectuals in the West, who saw it as an alternative to the traditional ancien regime of Europe. Western perception of China even in the 18th century admired the Chinese bureaucratic system as favourable over European governments for its seeming meritocracy; Voltaire claimed that the Chinese had "perfected moral science" and François Quesnay advocated an economic and political system modeled after that of the Chinese.
The governments of China, Egypt, Peru and Empress Catherine II were regarded as models of Enlightened Despotism, admired by such figures as Diderot, D'Alembert and Voltaire.

Napoleonic France adopted this meritocracy system  and soon saw a rapid and dramatic expansion of government, accompanied by the rise of the French civil service and its complex systems of bureaucracy. This phenomenon became known as "bureaumania". In the early 19th century, Napoleon attempted to reform the bureaucracies of France and other territories under his control by the imposition of the standardized Napoleonic Code. But paradoxically, that led to even further growth of the bureaucracy.

French civil service examinations adopted in the late 19th century were also heavily based on general cultural studies. These features have been likened to the earlier Chinese model.

Other industrialized nations
By the mid-19th century, bureaucratic forms of administration were firmly in place across the industrialized world. Thinkers like John Stuart Mill and Karl Marx began to theorize about the economic functions and power-structures of bureaucracy in contemporary life. Max Weber was the first to endorse bureaucracy as a necessary feature of modernity, and by the late 19th century bureaucratic forms had begun their spread from government to other large-scale institutions.

Within capitalist systems, informal bureaucratic structures began to appear in the form of corporate power hierarchies, as detailed in mid-century works like The Organization Man and The Man in the Gray Flannel Suit. Meanwhile, in the Soviet Union and Eastern Bloc nations, a powerful class of bureaucratic administrators termed nomenklatura governed nearly all aspects of public life.

The 1980s brought a backlash against perceptions of "big government" and the associated bureaucracy. Politicians like Margaret Thatcher and Ronald Reagan gained power by promising to eliminate government regulatory bureaucracies, which they saw as overbearing, and return economic production to a more purely capitalistic mode, which they saw as more efficient. In the business world, managers like Jack Welch gained fortune and renown by eliminating bureaucratic structures inside corporations. Still, in the modern world, most organized institutions rely on bureaucratic systems to manage information, process records, and administer complex systems, although the decline of paperwork and the widespread use of electronic databases is transforming the way bureaucracies function.

Theories

Karl Marx
Karl Marx theorized about the role and function of bureaucracy in his Critique of Hegel's Philosophy of Right, published in 1843. In Philosophy of Right, Hegel had supported the role of specialized officials in public administration, although he never used the term "bureaucracy" himself. By contrast, Marx was opposed to bureaucracy. Marx posited that while corporate and government bureaucracy seem to operate in opposition, in actuality they mutually rely on one another to exist. He wrote that "The Corporation is civil society's attempt to become state; but the bureaucracy is the state which has really made itself into civil society."

John Stuart Mill
Writing in the early 1860s, political scientist John Stuart Mill theorized that successful monarchies were essentially bureaucracies, and found evidence of their existence in Imperial China, the Russian Empire, and the regimes of Europe. Mill referred to bureaucracy as a distinct form of government, separate from representative democracy. He believed bureaucracies had certain advantages, most importantly the accumulation of experience in those who actually conduct the affairs. Nevertheless, he believed this form of governance compared poorly to representative government, as it relied on appointment rather than direct election. Mill wrote that ultimately the bureaucracy stifles the mind, and that "a bureaucracy always tends to become a pedantocracy."

Max Weber

The German sociologist Max Weber was the first to formally study bureaucracy and his works led to the popularization of this term. In his essay Bureaucracy,, published in his magnum opus Economy and Society, Weber described many ideal-typical forms of public administration, government, and business. His ideal-typical bureaucracy, whether public or private, is characterized by:
 hierarchical organization
 formal lines of authority (chain of command)
 a fixed area of activity
 rigid division of labor
 regular and continuous execution of assigned tasks
 all decisions and powers specified and restricted by regulations
 officials with expert training in their fields
 career advancement dependent on technical qualifications
 qualifications evaluated by organizational rules, not individuals

Weber listed several preconditions for the emergence of bureaucracy, including an increase in the amount of space and population being administered, an increase in the complexity of the administrative tasks being carried out, and the existence of a monetary economy requiring a more efficient administrative system. Development of communication and transportation technologies make more efficient administration possible, and democratization and rationalization of culture results in demands for equal treatment.

Although he was not necessarily an admirer of bureaucracy, Weber saw bureaucratization as the most efficient and rational way of organizing human activity and therefore as the key to rational-legal authority, indispensable to the modern world. Furthermore, he saw it as the key process in the ongoing rationalization of Western society. Weber also saw bureaucracy, however, as a threat to individual freedoms, and the ongoing bureaucratization as leading to a "polar night of icy darkness", in which increasing rationalization of human life traps individuals in a soulless "iron cage" of bureaucratic, rule-based, rational control. Weber's critical study of the bureaucratization of society became one of the most enduring parts of his work. Many aspects of modern public administration are based on his work, and a classic, hierarchically organized civil service of the Continental type is called "Weberian civil service" or "Weberian bureaucracy". It is debated among social scientists whether Weberian bureaucracy contributes to economic growth.

Woodrow Wilson

Writing as an academic while a professor at Bryn Mawr College, Woodrow Wilson's essay The Study of Administration argued for bureaucracy as a professional cadre, devoid of allegiance to fleeting politics. Wilson advocated a bureaucracy that: ...is a part of political life only as the methods of the counting house are a part of the life of society; only as machinery is part of the manufactured product. But it is, at the same time, raised very far above the dull level of mere technical detail by the fact that through its greater principles it is directly connected with the lasting maxims of political wisdom, the permanent truths of political progress. Wilson did not advocate a replacement of rule by the governed, he simply advised that, "Administrative questions are not political questions. Although politics sets the tasks for administration, it should not be suffered to manipulate its offices". This essay became a foundation for the study of public administration in America.

Ludwig von Mises

In his 1944 work Bureaucracy, the Austrian economist Ludwig von Mises compared bureaucratic management to profit management. Profit management, he argued, is the most effective method of organization when the services rendered may be checked by economic calculation of profit and loss. When, however, the service in question can not be subjected to economic calculation, bureaucratic management is necessary. He did not oppose universally bureaucratic management; on the contrary, he argued that bureaucracy is an indispensable method for social organization, for it is the only method by which the law can be made supreme, and is the protector of the individual against despotic arbitrariness. Using the example of the Catholic Church, he pointed out that bureaucracy is only appropriate for an organization whose code of conduct is not subject to change. He then went on to argue that complaints about bureaucratization usually refer not to the criticism of the bureaucratic methods themselves, but to "the intrusion of bureaucracy into all spheres of human life." Mises saw bureaucratic processes at work in both the private and public spheres; however, he believed that bureaucratization in the private sphere could only occur as a consequence of government interference. According to him, "What must be realized is only that the strait jacket  of bureaucratic organization paralyzes the individual's initiative, while within the capitalist market society an innovator still has a chance to succeed. The former makes for stagnation and preservation of inveterate methods, the latter makes for progress and improvement."

Robert K. Merton
American sociologist Robert K. Merton expanded on Weber's theories of bureaucracy in his work Social Theory and Social Structure, published in 1957. While Merton agreed with certain aspects of Weber's analysis, he also noted the dysfunctional aspects of bureaucracy, which he attributed to a "trained incapacity" resulting from "over conformity". He believed that bureaucrats are more likely to defend their own entrenched interests than to act to benefit the organization as a whole but that pride in their craft makes them resistant to changes in established routines. Merton stated that bureaucrats emphasize formality over interpersonal relationships, and have been trained to ignore the special circumstances of particular cases, causing them to come across as "arrogant" and "haughty".

Elliott Jaques 
In his book A General Theory of Bureaucracy, first published in 1976, Dr. Elliott Jaques describes the discovery of a universal and uniform underlying structure of managerial or work levels in the bureaucratic hierarchy for any type of employment systems.

Elliott Jaques argues and presents evidence that for the bureaucracy to provide a valuable contribution to the open society some of the following conditions must be met:
 Number of levels in a bureaucracy hierarchy must match the complexity level of the employment system for which the bureaucratic hierarchy is created (Elliott Jaques identified maximum 8 levels of complexity for bureaucratic hierarchies).
 Roles within a bureaucratic hierarchy differ in the level of work complexity.
 The level of work complexity in the roles must be matched with the level of human capability of the role holders (Elliott Jaques identified maximum 8 Levels of human capability).
 The level of work complexity in any managerial role within a bureaucratic hierarchy must be one level higher than the level of work complexity of the subordinate roles.
 Any managerial role in a bureaucratic hierarchy must have full managerial accountabilities and authorities (veto selection to the team, decide task types and specific task assignments, decide personal effectiveness and recognition, decide initiation of removal from the team within due process).
 Lateral working accountabilities and authorities must be defined for all the roles in the hierarchy (7 types of lateral working accountabilities and authorities: collateral, advisory, service-getting and -giving, coordinative, monitoring, auditing, prescribing).
The definition of effective bureaucratic hierarchy by Elliott Jaques is of importance not only to sociology but to social psychology, social anthropology, economics, politics, and social philosophy. They also have a practical application in business and administrative studies.

Bureaucracy and democracy
Like every modern state, a liberal democracy is highly bureaucratized, with numerous sizable organizations filled with career civil servants. Some of those bureaucracies have a substantial amount of influence to preserve the current political system because they are primarily focused on defending the country and the state from threats from both within and beyond. Since these institutions frequently operate independently and are mostly shielded from politics, they frequently have no affiliation with any particular political party or group. For instance, loyal British civil officials work for both the Conservative and Labour parties. However, on occasion a group might seize control of a bureaucratic state, as the Nazis did in Germany in the 1930s.

Although numerous ideals associated with democracy, such as equality, participation, and individuality, are in stark contrast to those associated with modern bureaucracy, specifically hierarchy, specialization, and impersonality, political theorists did not recognize bureaucracy as a threat to democracy. Yet democratic theorists still have not developed a sufficient solution to the problem bureaucratic authority poses to democratic government. 

One answer to this problem is to say that bureaucracy has no place at all in a real democracy. Theorists who adopt this perspective typically understand that they must demonstrate that bureaucracy does not necessarily occur in every contemporary society, only in those they perceive to be non-democratic. Because their democracy was resistant to bureaucracy, nineteenth-century British writers frequently referred to it as the "Continental nuisance".

According to Marx and other socialist thinkers, the most advanced bureaucracies were those in France and Germany. However, they argued that bureaucracy was a symptom of the bourgeois state and would vanish along with capitalism, which gave rise to the bourgeois state. Though clearly not the democracies Marx had in mind, socialist societies ended up being more bureaucratic than the governments they replaced. Similarly, after capitalist economies developed the administrative systems required to support their extensive welfare states, the idea that bureaucracy exclusively exists in socialist governments could scarcely be maintained.

See also
 Adhocracy 
 Anarchy
 Authority
 Civil servant
 Hierarchical organization
 Michel Crozier
 Power (social and political)
 Public administration
 Red tape
 Requisite Organization
 State (polity)
 Technocracy

References

Further reading

 Albrow, Martin. Bureaucracy. (London: Macmillan, 1970).
 Cheng, Tun-Jen, Stephan Haggard, and David Kang. "Institutions and growth in Korea and Taiwan: the bureaucracy". in East Asian Development: New Perspectives (Routledge, 2020) pp. 87-111. online
 Cornell, Agnes, Carl Henrik Knutsen, and Jan Teorell. "Bureaucracy and Growth". Comparative Political Studies 53.14 (2020): 2246-2282. online
 Crooks, Peter, and Timothy H. Parsons, eds. Empires and bureaucracy in world history: from late antiquity to the twentieth century (Cambridge University Press, 2016) online.
 Kingston, Ralph. Bureaucrats and Bourgeois Society: Office Politics and Individual Credit, 1789–1848. Palgrave Macmillan, 2011.
Neil Garston (ed.), Bureaucracy: Three Paradigms. Boston: Kluwer, 1993.
 On Karl Marx: Hal Draper, Karl Marx's Theory of Revolution, Volume 1: State and Bureaucracy. New York: Monthly Review Press, 1979.
 Marx comments on the state bureaucracy in his Critique of Hegel's Philosophy of Right and Engels discusses the origins of the state in Origins of the Family, marxists.org 
Ludwig von Mises, Bureaucracy, Yale University Press, 1962. Liberty Fund (2007), 
Schwarz, Bill. (1996). The expansion of England: race, ethnicity and cultural history. Psychology Pres; .
  On Weber 

Weber, Max. The Theory of Social and Economic Organization. Translated by A.M. Henderson and Talcott Parsons. London: Collier Macmillan Publishers, 1947.

Weber, Max, "Bureaucracy" in Weber, Max. Weber's Rationalism and Modern Society: New translations on Politics, Bureaucracy, and Social Stratification. Edited and Translated by Tony Waters and Dagmar Waters, 2015. . English translation of "Bureaucracy" by Max Weber.

 
Government
Max Weber
Organizational theory
Management theory
Political science